Poortsundet is a sound that separates Nordre Repøya from Søre Repøya, off Orvin Land at Nordaustlandet, Svalbard. The Poortsundet sound has a width of about 1.4 nautical miles. It is named after the Arctic explorer William Poort.

References

Straits of Svalbard